Reignfall is the third extended play by American rapper Chamillionaire released in promotion of his third studio album, Poison. The EP was released on July 23, 2013, by his record label Chamillitary Entertainment and Republic Records.

Background
On January 17, 2013 Chamillionaire announced he would release various EP's in promotion of his third studio album Poison. The first he released was Ammunition on March 20, 2012. Second, he released Elevate and it was officially released on February 12, 2013. On July 22, 2013 he released the title track featuring Scarface, Killer Mike and Bobby Moon along with the track list.

Track listing

Charts
Reignfall was Chamillionaires first project since his second studio album Ultimate Victory to chart on a Billboard chart.

References

Chamillionaire albums
Chamillitary Entertainment albums
2013 EPs